Avraham Mattisyahu Friedman (1848 - 1933), also known as Abraham/Avrum Matitiahu Friedman was a Romanian rabbi, the Shtefanesht Tzadik. 
He is considered one of the most important figures of Hasidism.

References

20th-century Romanian rabbis
Bukovina Jews
Hasidic rabbis
Clergy from Chernivtsi
1848 births
1933 deaths
19th-century Romanian rabbis